is a Japanese female professional ten-pin bowler. She is a member of the Japan Professional Bowling Association, license no. 372.

Biography 
As a 13-year-old, Itakura was into swimming. She was good enough to participate in the Junior Olympics. After retiring from swimming, she took up bowling upon the recommendation of her mother. She was coached by Yoshikazu Nishida. While in school, she captured three high school tournaments, including the 1993 17th All-Japan High School Championship.

After graduating from high school, Itakura planned on working in the bowling business, starting off as an office lady at a bowling center. In 1997, at the age of 22 years, she gave up her job when she was selected as a member of the Japan national team. Between 1999 and 2000, Itakura competed in various professional and amateur tournaments. She competed in the NHK Cup Japan All-Star Championships. And, she became the first and only Japanese to win the AMF World Cup (2001).

Itakura became a professional in 2003, becoming the first bowler to enter the JPBA under a waiver, based on her success as an amateur, thereby bypassing the qualifying stages (usually, a bowler has to qualify via a series of difficult tests, which for many bowlers takes multiple years before they are successful.)

In 2011, Itakura-pro finished the JPBA season 24th in points (980), 19th in scoring average (206.21), and 24th in money with 784,000 yen.

Major accomplishments 
Amateur
 1993　- 17th All-Japan High School Championship (winner)
 1999　- 33rd Japan Invitational Bowling Championships (winner)
 1999 - 12th All-Japan Ladies Tournament, Youth Division (winner)
 2000　- 34th Japan Invitational Bowling Championships (winner)
 2001　- 37th AMF World Cup (winner)

Professional
 2003　- 35th All Japan Women's Pro Bowling Championship (winner)
 2004　- 36th All Japan Women's Pro Bowling Championship (winner)
 2005　- 27th Kansai Women's Open (winner)
 2005 - Pro Bowling Ladies 新人戦 (winner)
 2007　- BIGBOX Higashi Yamato Cup (winner)
 2010 - 26th Rokko Queens (winner)

DHC
 2006　DHC Ladies Bowling Tour 2005/2006 - 5th-leg (winner)

P★League
 Tournament 4 - 2nd place

External links 
P★League
Official site
Star Lanes (her home lanes)

1975 births
Living people
People from Osaka Prefecture
Japanese ten-pin bowling players
Asian Games medalists in bowling
Bowlers at the 1998 Asian Games
Bowlers at the 2002 Asian Games
Asian Games bronze medalists for Japan
Medalists at the 1998 Asian Games